Santo Domingo de Silos is a municipality and town located in the province of Burgos, Castile and León, Spain. According to the 2004 census (INE), the municipality had a population of 292 inhabitants.

The village is preserved by the heritage listing of conjunto histórico.

Main sights

 Abbey of Santo Domingo de Silos (7th-18th century).
 Sad Hill Cemetery, reconstructed set of the film The Good, the Bad and the Ugly (1966)

References

Municipalities in the Province of Burgos